The 2022 Macha Lake Open was a professional tennis tournament played on outdoor clay courts. It was the twentieth edition of the tournament which was part of the 2022 ITF Women's World Tennis Tour. It took place in Česká Lípa, Czech Republic between 13 and 19 June 2022.

Champions

Singles

  Sára Bejlek def.  Jesika Malečková, 6–4, 6–4

Doubles

  Karolína Kubáňová /  Aneta Kučmová def.  Nuria Brancaccio /  Despina Papamichail, 6–2, 7–6(11–9)

Singles main draw entrants

Seeds

 1 Rankings are as of 6 June 2022.

Other entrants
The following players received wildcards into the singles main draw:
  Lucie Havlíčková
  Linda Klimovičová
  Amélie Šmejkalová
  Julie Štruplová
  Karolína Vlčková

The following players received entry from the qualifying draw:
  Bianca Behúlová
  Nikola Břečková
  Nikola Daubnerová
  Denisa Hindová
  Karolína Kubáňová
  Eszter Méri
  Luisa Meyer auf der Heide
  Aurora Zantedeschi

The following players received entry as lucky losers:
  Denise Hrdinková
  Timea Jarušková

References

External links
 2022 Macha Lake Open at ITFtennis.com
 Official website

2022 ITF Women's World Tennis Tour
2022 in Czech sport
June 2022 sports events in the Czech Republic